This article shows All past squads from the Italian professional volleyball team Imoco Volley from the Serie A League.

All Past Rosters

2021–22
Season 2021–2022

Honours
  Club World Championship: 2
  CEV Champions League: 2 
  Serie A1: 1
  Italian Cup: 1
  Italian Supercup: 1

2020–21
Season 2020–2021

Honours
  CEV Champions League: 1
  Serie A1: 1
  Italian Cup: 1
  Italian Supercup: 1

2019–20
Season 2019–2020

Honours
  Club World Championship: 1
  CEV Champions League: Cancelled 
  Serie A1: Cancelled
  Italian Cup: 1
  Italian Supercup: 1

2018–19
Season 2018–2019

Honours
  CEV Champions League: 2
  Serie A1: 1
  Italian Cup: 2
  Italian Supercup: 1

2017–18
Season 2017–2018

Honours
  CEV Champions League: 3
  Serie A1: 1
  Italian Cup: 2
  Italian Supercup: 2

2016–17
Season 2016–2017

Honours
  CEV Champions League: 2
  Serie A1: 3
  Italian Cup: 1
  Italian Supercup: 1

2015–16 
Season 2015–2016

Honours
  Serie A1: 1
  Italian Cup: 5

2014–15
Season 2014–2015

Honours
  CEV Cup: 9
  Serie A1: 4
  Italian Cup: 3

2013–14
Season 2013–2014

Honours
  CEV Champions League: 8
  Serie A1: 2
  Italian Cup: 5
  Italian Supercup: 2

2012–13
Season 2012–2013

Honours
  Serie A1: 2
  Italian Cup: 5

References

External links

Official website 
 
 
 
 
 Imoco volley on Volleybox

Italian women's volleyball club squads